The Spain women's national 3x3 team is the 3x3 basketball team representing Spain in international women's competitions, organized and run by the Spanish Basketball Federation.

At the 2019 World Cup, the no. 7 ranked player in the world Aitana Cuevas led the tournament in 8 points per game to lead Spain to the quarters.

Senior Competitions

World Cup

European Games

Europe Championships

Mediterranean Games

Youth Competitions

Youth Olympics

Under-18 World Championships

See also

 Spanish Basketball Federation
 Spain national basketball team
 Spain men's national 3x3 team

References

External links

3
Women's national 3x3 basketball teams